KTKC (1460 AM) is a radio station broadcasting a Spanish language Christian format, relaying programming from primary station KHCB League City, Texas. Licensed to Springhill, Louisiana, United States, the station is currently owned by Houston Christian Broadcasters, Inc.

References

External links
KTKC website

Christian radio stations in Louisiana
Spanish-language radio stations
Webster Parish, Louisiana